Paul Fleming (born 6 September 1967) is an English former professional footballer who played as a right back, making over 200 career appearances.

Career
Born in Halifax, Fleming played for Halifax Town, Mansfield Town and Chorley.

Honours
Individual
PFA Team of the Year: 1991–92 Fourth Division

References

1967 births
Living people
English footballers
Halifax Town A.F.C. players
Mansfield Town F.C. players
Chorley F.C. players
English Football League players
Association football fullbacks